Year 1545 (MDXLV) was a common year starting on Thursday (link will display the full calendar) of the Julian calendar.

Events 
 January–June 
 February 22 – A firman of the Ottoman Empire is issued for the dethronement of Radu Paisie as Prince of Wallachia.
 February 27 – Battle of Ancrum Moor: The Scots are victorious over numerically superior English forces.
 March 24 – At a diet in Worms, Germany, summoned by Pope Paul III, the German Protestant princes demand a national religious settlement for Germany. Holy Roman Emperor, Charles V refuses.
April 1 – Potosí is founded by the Spanish as a mining town after the discovery of huge silver deposits in this area of modern-day Bolivia. Silver mined from Huayna Potosí Mountain provides most of the wealth on which the Spanish Empire is based until its fall in the early 19th century.
 June 13 – Spanish explorer Yñigo Ortiz de Retez sets out to navigate the northern coast of New Guinea.

 July–December 
 July 18–19 – Battle of the Solent between the English and French fleets: The engagement is inconclusive, but on the second day Henry VIII of England's flagship, the Mary Rose, sinks.
 c. July 21 – Italian Wars: Battle of Bonchurch – The English reverse an attempted French invasion of the Isle of Wight, off the coast of England.
 c. September – Mobye Narapati succeeds as ruler of the Ava Kingdom and offers peace to the Taungoo Dynasty, ending the Taungoo–Ava War (1538–45), and leaving the Taungoo as the dominant rulers in Burma.
 October – The Siege of Kawagoe Castle begins, as part of an unsuccessful attempt by the Uesugi clan to regain Kawagoe Castle from the Late Hōjō clan in Japan. 
 December 13 – The Council of Trent officially opens in northern Italy (it closes in 1563).

 Undated 
 Battle of Sokhoista: The army of the Ottoman Empire defeats an alliance of Georgian dynasties.
 Diogo I Nkumbi a Mpudi overthrows his uncle Pedro I of Kongo to become manikongo.
 In China, a large failure of the harvest in Henan province occurs due to excessive rainfall, which drives up the price of wheat, and forces many to flee their rural counties; those who stay behind are forced to survive by eating leaves, bark, and human flesh.
 In the territory of New Spain in modern-day Mexico, the Cocoliztli Epidemic of 1545–1548 begins. 
 St. Anne's Church, Augsburg converts to Lutheranism.

Births 

 January 1 – Magnus Heinason, Faroese naval hero (d. 1589)
 January 11 – Guidobaldo del Monte, Italian mathematician, astronomer and philosopher (d. 1607)
 March – Gaspare Tagliacozzi, Italian surgeon and anatomist (d. 1599)
 March 2 – Thomas Bodley, English diplomat and scholar, founder of the Bodleian Library, Oxford (d. 1613)
 March 18 – Julius Echter von Mespelbrunn, German bishop (d. 1617)
 March 25 – John II, Duke of Schleswig-Holstein-Sonderburg, Duke of Schleswig-Holstein-Sønderburg (d. 1622)
 April 1 – Peder Claussøn Friis, Norwegian clergyman and author (d. 1614)
 April 2 – Elisabeth of Valois, queen of Philip II of Spain (d. 1568)
 April 15 – Karl II, Duke of Münsterberg-Oels, Duke of Oels (1565–1617), Duke of Bernstadt (1604–1617) (d. 1617)
 April 24 – Henry Wriothesley, 2nd Earl of Southampton, English earl (d. 1581)
 April 28 – Yi Sun-sin, Korean naval commander (d. 1598)
 May 1 – Franciscus Junius, French theologian (d. 1602)
 May 22 – Karl Christoph, Duke of Münsterberg (d. 1569)
 June 6 – Jerome Gratian, Spanish Carmelite and writer (d. 1614)
 June 13 – Naitō Nobunari, Japanese samurai and daimyō of Omi Province (d. 1612)
 June 19 – Princess Anna Maria of Sweden, Swedish royal (d. 1610)
 July 8 – Don Carlos of Spain, son of Philip II of Spain (d. 1568)
 August 1 – Andrew Melville, Scottish theologian and religious reformer (d. 1622)
 August 27 – Alexander Farnese, Duke of Parma (d. 1592)
 September 7 – Eitel Friedrich IV, Count of Hohenzollern, First Count of Hohenzollern-Hechingen (d. 1605)
 September 20 – Yamanaka Yukimori, Japanese samurai (d. 1578)
 October 15 – Elisabeth of Anhalt-Zerbst, Abbess of Gernrode and Frose, later Countess of Barby-Mühlingen (d. 1574)
 October 19 – John Juvenal Ancina, Italian oratorian and bishop (d. 1604)
 November 20 – Ernst Ludwig, Duke of Pomerania (d. 1592)
 November 25 – Ana de Jesús, Spanish Discalced Carmelite nun and spiritual writer (d. 1621)
 December 6 – Janus Dousa, Dutch historian and noble (d. 1604)
 December 7 – Henry Stuart, Lord Darnley, consort of Mary, Queen of Scots (d. 1567)
 date unknown
 George Bannatyne, collector of Scottish poems (d. 1608)
 John Field, British Puritan clergyman and controversialist (d. 1588)
 John Gerard, English botanist (d. 1612)
 Ismihan Sultan, Ottoman princess, daughter of Selim II and wife of Sokollu Mehmed Pasha (d. 1585)
 William Morgan, Welsh Bible translator (d. 1604)
 Azai Nagamasa, Japanese nobleman (d. 1573)
 Mashita Nagamori, Japanese warlord (d. 1615)
 probable – Nicholas Breton, English poet and novelist (d. 1626)

Deaths 

 January 16 – George Spalatin, German reformer (b. 1484)
 February 12 or April 2 – Stanisław Odrowąż, Polish noble (b. 1509)
 April 3 – Antonio de Guevara, Spanish chronicler and moralist (b. 1481)
 April 10 – Costanzo Festa, Italian composer (b. 1495)
 April 22 – Louis X, Duke of Bavaria (b. 1496)
 April 25 – Jobst II, Count of Hoya (b. 1493)
 May – Agnes Howard, Duchess of Norfolk, English noblewoman (b. c. 1477)
 May 22 – Sher Shah Suri, Indian ruler (b. 1486)
 June 4 – John Louis, Count of Nassau-Saarbrücken (1472–1545) (b. 1472)
 June 12 – Francis I, Duke of Lorraine (b. 1517)
 June 15 – Elizabeth of Austria, Polish noble (b. 1526)
 July 7 – Pernette Du Guillet, French poet (b. c. 1520)
 July 12 – Maria Manuela, Princess of Portugal (b. 1527)
 August 8 – Injong of Joseon, 12th king of the Joseon Dynasty of Korea (b. 1515)
 August 22 – Charles Brandon, 1st Duke of Suffolk, English politician and husband of Mary Tudor (b. c. 1484)
 August 27 – Piotr Gamrat, Polish Catholic archbishop (b. 1487)
 September
 Hans Baldung, German artist (b. 1480)
 Hkonmaing, king of the Ava kingdom (b. c. 1497)
 September 1 – Francis de Bourbon, Count of St. Pol, French noble (b. 1491)
 September 9 – Charles II de Valois, Duke of Orléans, (b. 1522)
 September 24 – Albert of Mainz, elector and archbishop of Mainz (b. 1490)
 October 18 – John Taverner, English composer (b. c. 1490)
 date unknown
 William Latimer, English churchman and scholar (b. c. 1467)
 Fernão Lopez, Portuguese renegade
 Vicente Masip, Spanish painter (b. 1506)

References